Philadelphia soul, sometimes called Philly soul, the Philadelphia sound, Phillysound, or The Sound of Philadelphia (TSOP), is a genre of late 1960s–1970s soul music characterized by funk influences and lush instrumental arrangements, often featuring sweeping strings and piercing horns. The genre laid the groundwork for disco by fusing the R&B rhythm sections of the 1960s with the pop vocal tradition, and featuring a slightly more pronounced jazz influence in its melodic structures and arrangements. Fred Wesley, the trombonist of the James Brown band and Parliament-Funkadelic, described the signature deep but orchestrated sound as "putting the bow tie on funk."

Style
Due to the emphasis on sound and arrangement and the relative anonymity of many of the style's players, Philadelphia soul is often considered a producers' genre.  Bunny Sigler, Kenny Gamble and Leon Huff were credited with developing the genre.

Philadelphia soul songwriters and producers included Bobby Martin, Thom Bell, Linda Creed, Norman Harris, Dexter Wansel, and the production teams of McFadden & Whitehead and Gamble & Huff of Philadelphia International Records, who worked with a stable of studio musicians to develop the unique Philadelphia sound used as backing for many different singing acts. Many of these musicians would record as the instrumental group MFSB, which had a hit with the seminal Philadelphia soul song "TSOP (The Sound of Philadelphia)" in 1974.

Notable extensions of the Philadelphia sound were bassist Ronald Baker, guitarist Norman Harris and drummer/Trammps baritone Earl Young (B-H-Y), who also recorded as the Trammps and would produce records themselves. These three were the base rhythm section for MFSB, and branched off into a sub-label of Philadelphia International Records called Golden Fleece, distributed by CBS Records (now Sony Music). Soon after, Harris created the Gold Mind label in conjunction with Salsoul Records. Gold Mind's roster included First Choice, Loleatta Holloway, and Love Committee, all of whom would feature Baker/Harris/Young productions of their material. Their 1976 hit by Double Exposure, "Ten Percent", was the first commercial 12-inch single.

Philadelphia soul was popular throughout the 1970s, and it set the stage for the studio constructions of disco and urban contemporary music that emerged later in the decade. Its style had a strong influence on later Philadelphia acts, most notably Daryl Hall John Oates, The Roots, Vivian Green, Jill Scott and Musiq Soulchild. David Bowie's 1975 album Young Americans was partially recorded in Philadelphia and influenced by the Philadelphia soul sound.

See also 

 Philadelphia International Records
 Sigma Sound Studios
 Rock and Soul
 Progressive soul

References

Further reading
 Cummings, Tony (1975). The Sound of Philadelphia. London: Eyre Methuen.
 Jackson, John A. (2004). A House on Fire: The Rise and Fall of Philadelphia Soul. New York: Oxford University Press. .
 Moore, Dave & Thornton, Jason (2016). The There's That Beat! Guide to THE PHILLY SOUND. Stockholm: Premium Publishing. .

Culture of Philadelphia
Music scenes
Soul music genres